Erin-Ile is an agrarian community in Kwara State, Nigeria. It's an ancient town with history dated back to 13th century. It was formerly the local government head quarters of Oyun local government before it got moved to Ilemona. Erin Ile was founded around 1225AD by prince Odumasa apayaan ( first elerin) and other warriors such as olowe and others.

About
Erin Ile is a peace loving, hospitable and law abiding community. Erin Ile is a town with a large expanse of arable land. Erin Ile shares boundaries with Ilemona, Irra, Offa, Eku-Apa, Ipee and Igosun all in Kwara State and Oyan, Ila Orangun and Ila Odo in Osun State. Culturally, Erin Ile is a typical Yoruba town.

History
The historical origin of Erin Ile revolves around Odumosa Apaayan, an illustrious Ife Prince who's a renowned Hunter and his younger brother, Alawode Arebiope, both of them are Children of Obalufon Alayemore and grandchildren of King Obalufon Ogbogbodirin of Ile Ife. The Obalufon festival is an annual festival held in Erin-Ile in honor of their ancestor from Ife. Erin Ile speak the Ibolo dialect of the Yoruba language.

Moje College of Education
Moje College of education is a government accredited college of education in Erin-Ile. The college has programs in education, language, sciences, arts and social sciences.

Riots with Offa

The town have been in several conflicts with the neighboring town Offa over land for several years since 1973 when the Supreme Court first ruled on the issue. In 2013, Federal Polytechnic, Offa was closed down due to the riots. The Masjid noor and the descendant union in offa were vandalised. Erin-Ile was under attack as well, which resulted in people living at the boarder relocating

References

Towns in Nigeria
Towns in Yorubaland